There are at least 314 named cemeteries in Idaho.

Idaho  is a state in the Rocky Mountain area of the United States.   Idaho is the 14th most expansive, the 39th most populous, and the 7th least densely populated of the 50 United States.

 Alpha Cemetery, Valley County, Idaho, el.  
 American Ridge Cemetery, Latah County, Idaho, el.  
 Ammon Cemetery, Bonneville County, Idaho, el.  
 Angel Ridge Cemetery, Nez Perce County, Idaho, el.  
 Antelope Cemetery, Butte County, Idaho, el.  
 Barton Cemetery, Custer County, Idaho, el.  
 Basalt Cemetery, Bingham County, Idaho, el.  
 Basin Cemetery, Cassia County, Idaho, el.  
 Bates Cemetery, Teton County, Idaho, el.  
 Battle Ridge Cemetery, Idaho County, Idaho, el.  
 Battleground Cemetery, Custer County, Idaho, el.  
 Beaver Dick Cemetery, Madison County, Idaho, el.  
 Bellevue Cemetery, Blaine County, Idaho, el.  
 Bestland Cemetery, Kootenai County, Idaho, el.  
 Bethany Cemetery, Latah County, Idaho, el.  
 Bethel Cemetery, Latah County, Idaho, el.  
 Beulah Cemetery, Latah County, Idaho, el.  
 Blaine Cemetery, Latah County, Idaho, el.  
 Boot Hill Cemetery, Boise County, Idaho, el.  
 Boot Hill Cemetery, Custer County, Idaho, el.  
 Boulder Creek Cemetery, Boundary County, Idaho, el.  
 Bovill Cemetery, Latah County, Idaho, el.  
 Bower Cemetery, Cassia County, Idaho, el.  
 Buchanan Cemetery, Latah County, Idaho, el.  
 Buhl Cemetery, Twin Falls County, Idaho, el.  
 Burnt Ridge Cemetery, Latah County, Idaho, el.  
 Burton Cemetery, Madison County, Idaho, el.  
 Cache Clawson Cemetery, Teton County, Idaho, el.  
 Canfield Cemetery, Idaho County, Idaho, el.  
 Canyon Hill Cemetery, Canyon County, Idaho, el.  
 Carey Cemetery, Blaine County, Idaho, el.  
 Cedron Cemetery, Teton County, Idaho, el.  
 Central Cemetery, Jefferson County, Idaho, el.  
 Central Ridge Cemetery, Lewis County, Idaho, el.  
 Chester Cemetery, Fremont County, Idaho, el.  
 Chesterfield Cemetery, Caribou County, Idaho, el.  
 Chief Tendoy Cemetery, Lemhi County, Idaho, el.  
 Chilly Cemetery, Custer County, Idaho, el.  
 Clara Cemetery, Bonner County, Idaho, el.  
 Clearwater Cemetery, Idaho County, Idaho, el.  
 Cleveland Cemetery, Franklin County, Idaho, el.  
 Cloverdale Memorial Park, Ada County, Idaho, el.  
 Coeur d'Alene Indian Cemetery, Kootenai County, Idaho, el.  
 Coldsprings Cemetery, Lewis County, Idaho, el.  
 Copeland Cemetery, Boundary County, Idaho, el.  
 Cordelia Lutheran Cemetery, Latah County, Idaho, el.  
 Corral Cemetery, Camas County, Idaho, el.  
 Cottonwood Cemetery, Idaho County, Idaho, el.  
 Cottonwood Cemetery, Valley County, Idaho, el.  
 Cottonwood Cemetery, Adams County, Idaho, el.  
 Darlington Cemetery, Custer County, Idaho, el.  
 Declo Cemetery, Cassia County, Idaho, el.  
 Denver Cemetery, Idaho County, Idaho, el.  
 Dingle Cemetery, Bear Lake County, Idaho, el.  
 Downey Cemetery, Bannock County, Idaho, el.  
 Drake Cemetery, Bonner County, Idaho, el.  
 Driggs Cemetery, Teton County, Idaho, el.  
 Driggs-Darby Cemetery, Teton County, Idaho, el.  
 Dry Creek Cemetery, Ada County, Idaho, el.  
 Dry Creek Cemetery, Latah County, Idaho, el.  
 Elba Cemetery, Cassia County, Idaho, el.  
 Elmwood Cemetery, Gooding County, Idaho, el.  
 Elwood Cemetery, Latah County, Idaho, el.  
 Emmett Cemetery, Gem County, Idaho, el.  
 Evergreen Cemetery, Kootenai County, Idaho, el.  
 Evergreen Cemetery, Benewah County, Idaho, el.  
 Fairview Cemetery, Franklin County, Idaho, el.  
 Fairview Cemetery, Ada County, Idaho, el.  
 Fairview Cemetery, Idaho County, Idaho, el.  
 Falk Cemetery, Payette County, Idaho, el.  
 Falls View Cemetery, Power County, Idaho, el.  
 Fargo Cemetery, Canyon County, Idaho, el.  
 Farnum Cemetery, Fremont County, Idaho, el.  
 Felt Cemetery, Teton County, Idaho, el.  
 Finn Cemetery, Valley County, Idaho, el.  
 Fix Ridge Cemetery, Latah County, Idaho, el.  
 Fletcher Cemetery, Lewis County, Idaho, el.  
 Florence Cemetery, Idaho County, Idaho, el.  
 Forest Cemetery, Kootenai County, Idaho, el.  
 Forest Lawn Cemetery, Lewis County, Idaho, el.  
 Fort Boise Military Cemetery, Ada County, Idaho, el.  
 Franklin Cemetery, Franklin County, Idaho, el.  
 Fraser Cemetery, Clearwater County, Idaho, el.  
 Freedom Cemetery, Caribou County, Idaho, el.  
 Freeze Cemetery, Latah County, Idaho, el.  
 Galena Pioneer Cemetery, Blaine County, Idaho, el.  
 Galloway Cemetery, Washington County, Idaho, el.  
 Garden Valley Pioneer Cemetery, Boise County, Idaho, el.  
 Genesee Valley Lutheran Cemetery, Latah County, Idaho, el.  
 Geneva Cemetery, Bear Lake County, Idaho, el.  
 Gibson Cemetery, Bingham County, Idaho, el.  
 Glasby Cemetery, Nez Perce County, Idaho, el.  
 Goddard Cemetery, Clark County, Idaho, el.  
 Gold Creek Cemetery, Bonner County, Idaho, el.  
 Gold Hill Cemetery, Latah County, Idaho, el.  
 Gold Ridge Cemetery, Lewis County, Idaho, el.  
 Good Shepherd Cemetery, Bingham County, Idaho, el.  
 Grace Cemetery, Caribou County, Idaho, el.  
 Grandview Cemetery, Idaho County, Idaho, el.  
 Grandview Cemetery, Boundary County, Idaho, el.  
 Grant Ward Cemetery, Bannock County, Idaho, el.  
 Greenwood Cemetery, Shoshone County, Idaho, el.  
 Greenwood Cemetery, Kootenai County, Idaho, el.  
 Grove City Cemetery, Bingham County, Idaho, el.  
 Groveland Cemetery, Bingham County, Idaho, el.  
 Haden Cemetery, Teton County, Idaho, el.  
 Heller Grave, Shoshone County, Idaho, el.  
 Hill Cemetery, Clearwater County, Idaho, el.  
 Hill City Cemetery, Camas County, Idaho, el.  
 Hillcrest Cemetery, Bingham County, Idaho, el.  
 Hillcrest Cemetery, Butte County, Idaho, el.  
 Hillcrest Memorial Gardens, Canyon County, Idaho, el.  
 Holbrook Cemetery, Oneida County, Idaho, el.  
 Holy Trinity Cemetery, Lewis County, Idaho, el.  
 Home of the Peace Cemetery, Ada County, Idaho, el.  
 Homes Cemetery, Valley County, Idaho, el.  
 Homestead Cemetery, Bingham County, Idaho, el.  
 Hope Cemetery, Bonner County, Idaho, el.  
 Hot Springs Cemetery, Owyhee County, Idaho, el.  
 Houston Cemetery, Custer County, Idaho, el.  
 Idaho City Pioneer Cemetery, Boise County, Idaho, el.  
 Idaho State Veterans Cemetery, Ada County, Idaho, el.  
 Independent Order of Odd Fellows Cemetery, Boundary County, Idaho, el.  
 Independent Order of Odd Fellows Cemetery, Twin Falls County, Idaho, el.  
 Independent Order of Oddfellows Cemetery, Adams County, Idaho, el.  
 Indian Cemetery, Power County, Idaho, el.  
 Indian Cemetery, Bannock County, Idaho, el.  
 Indian Cemetery, Nez Perce County, Idaho, el.  
 Indian Valley Cemetery, Adams County, Idaho, el.  
 Inkom Cemetery, Bannock County, Idaho, el.  
 Iona Cemetery, Bonneville County, Idaho, el.  
 Jackson Cemetery, Cassia County, Idaho, el.  
 Jacob Reuben Graves, Owyhee County, Idaho, el.  
 John Day Cemetery, Clark County, Idaho, el.  
 Joseph Cemetery, Idaho County, Idaho, el.  
 Juliaetta Cemetery, Latah County, Idaho, el.  
 Junction Cemetery, Lemhi County, Idaho, el.  
 Kendrick Cemetery, Nez Perce County, Idaho, el.  
 Kendrick Cemetery, Latah County, Idaho, el.  
 Kennedy Cemetery, Payette County, Idaho, el.  
 Kessler Cemetery, Adams County, Idaho, el.  
 Kilgore Cemetery, Clark County, Idaho, el.  
 Klines Grave, Valley County, Idaho, el.  
 Lago Cemetery, Caribou County, Idaho, el.  
 Lakeview Cemetery, Bonner County, Idaho, el.  
 Lanark Cemetery, Bear Lake County, Idaho, el.  
 Lane Cemetery, Kootenai County, Idaho, el.  
 Lanes Grave Cemetery, Caribou County, Idaho, el.  
 Lava Hot Springs Cemetery, Bannock County, Idaho, el.  
 Leland Cemetery, Nez Perce County, Idaho, el.  
 Lenora Cemetery, Nez Perce County, Idaho, el.  
 Lewis and Clark Memorial Gardens, Nez Perce County, Idaho, el.  
 Lewisville Cemetery, Jefferson County, Idaho, el.  
 Liberty Cemetery, Bear Lake County, Idaho, el.  
 Lincoln Cemetery, Bonneville County, Idaho, el.  
 Little Bear Ridge Cemetery, Latah County, Idaho, el.  
 Lost River Cemetery, Butte County, Idaho, el.  
 Lower Boise Cemetery, Canyon County, Idaho, el.

Notes

Cemeteries in Idaho
Idaho (A-L)